is a railway station on the Iida Line in the city of Iida, Nagano Prefecture, Japan, operated by Central Japan Railway Company (JR Central).

Lines
Dashina Station is served by the Iida Line and is 121.1 kilometers from the starting point of the line at Toyohashi Station.

Station layout
The station consists of a single ground-level side platform serving one bi-directional track. There is no station building, but there is a shelter on the platform. The station is unattended.

Adjacent stations

History
Dashina Station opened on 8 April 1927.The station building burned down on 23 May 1998 and was rebuilt the following year.  With the privatization of Japanese National Railways (JNR) on 1 April 1987, the station came under the control of JR Central.

Passenger statistics
In fiscal 2015, the station was used by an average of 150 passengers daily (boarding passengers only).

Surrounding area
Dashina Post Office

See also
 List of railway stations in Japan

References

External links

 Dashina Station information 

Railway stations in Nagano Prefecture
Railway stations in Japan opened in 1927
Stations of Central Japan Railway Company
Iida Line
Iida, Nagano